The Roman Catholic Diocese of Villarrica del Espíritu Santo is a Latin Rite suffragan diocese in the Ecclesiastical province of the Metropolitan Archdiocese of Asunción, which cover all and only Paraguay.

Its cathedral episcopal see is Catedral Santa Clara, dedicated to Saint Clara, in the city of Villarrica, Guairá Department.

Statistics 
As per 2014, it pastorally served 342,000 Catholics (99.7% of 343,000 total) on 13,342 km² in 35 parishes, 43 priests (39 diocesan, 4 religious), 65 deacons, 89 lay religious (13 brothers, 76 sisters), 27 seminarians.

History 
 On May 1, 1929, the Diocese of Villarrica was established on territory split off from the then Roman Catholic Diocese of Paraguay
 It lost territories thrice : on 1957.01.19 to establish Diocese of San Juan Bautista, on 1957.01.21 to establish Territorial Prelature of Encarnación y Alto Paraná (now a diocese) and on 1978.06.05 to establish Diocese of Carapeguá.
 It enjoyed a Papal visit from Pope John Paul II in May 1988.
 On January 13, 1990, the diocese was renamed, or more precisely given an alternative name,  as Diocese of Villarrica del Espíritu Santo (avoiding confusing with its Chilean namesake)

Bishops
(all Roman Rite and natives)

Episcopal Ordinaries 
Suffragan Bishops of Villarrica
 Augustin Rodríguez (October 19, 1931 – December 7, 1965), next Titular Bishop of Castellum Tingitii (1965.12.07 – 1968.12.25) as Military Vicariate of Paraguay (1965.12.07 – death 1968.12.25)
 Felipe Santiago Benítez Avalos (December 4, 1965 – May 20, 1989),  also President of Episcopal Conference of Paraguay (1973 – 1985), First Vice-President of Latin American Episcopal Council (1983 – 1987); previously Titular Bishop of Chersonesus in Europa (1961.08.10 – 1965.12.04) as Auxiliary Bishop of Archdiocese of Asunción (Paraguay) (1961.08.10 – 1965.12.04); later Metropolitan Archbishop of Asunción (Paraguay) (1989.05.20 – retired 2002.06.15), President of Episcopal Conference of Paraguay (1989 – 1990), died 2009
 Auxiliary Bishop : Angel Nicolás Acha Duarte (1975.12.22 – 1978.06.05), Titular Bishop of Lamdia (1975.12.22 – 1978.06.05); later Bishop of Carapeguá (Paraguay) (1978.06.05 – death 1982.06.24)

''Suffragan Bishops of Villarrica (del Espíritu Santo)
 Sebelio Peralta Álvarez (April 19, 1990 – December 27, 2008), previously Titular Bishop of Iunca in Mauretania (1979.03.05 – 1990.04.19) as Auxiliary Bishop of Villarrica (1979.03.05 – succession 1990.04.19); later Bishop of San Lorenzo (Paraguay) (2008.12.27 – death 2014.11.19)
 Ricardo Jorge Valenzuela Rios (25 June 2010 – 29 June 2017), also Apostolic Administrator of Diocese of Ciudad del Este (Paraguay) (2014.09.25 – 2014.11.15), Vice-President of Episcopal Conference of Paraguay (2015.11.03 – ...); previously Titular Bishop of Casæ Calanæ (1993.11.27 – 2003.05.24) as Auxiliary Bishop of Archdiocese of Asunción (Paraguay) (1993.11.27 – 2003.05.24), Military Ordinary of Paraguay (2003.05.24 – 2010.06.25); later Bishop of Caacupé (Paraguay) (2017.06.29 – ...)
Adalberto Martínez Flores (23 June 2018 - ...), previously Titular Bishop of Tatilti (1997.08.14 – 2000.05.18) as Auxiliary Bishop of Archdiocese of Asunción (Paraguay) (1997.08.14 – 2000.05.18), Bishop of San Lorenzo (Paraguay) (2000.05.18 – 2007.02.19), Bishop of San Pedro (Paraguay) (2007.02.19 - 2012.03.14), Military Ordinary of Paraguay (2012.03.14 – 2018.06.23).

Auxiliary bishops
Angel Nicolás Acha Duarte (1975-1978), appointed Bishop of Carapeguá
Sebelio Peralta Alvarez (1979-1990), appointed Bishop here

Other priest of this diocese who became bishop
Amancio Francisco Benítez Candia, appointed Bishop of Benjamín Aceval in 2018

See also 
 List of Catholic dioceses in Paraguay
 near namesake Roman Catholic Diocese of Villarrica in Chile

Sources and external links 
 GCatholic.org - data for all sections
 Catholic Hierarchy

Roman Catholic dioceses in Paraguay
Religious organizations established in 1929
Roman Catholic dioceses and prelatures established in the 20th century
Roman Catholic Ecclesiastical Province of Asunción
Guairá Department
Villarrica